Young Lions is an Australian TV police drama shown on the Nine Network in 2002 and in Ireland on RTÉ Two. The storyline of the series revolved around the professional and private lives of four rookie detectives, the Young Lions, of South West 101, an inner city Sydney police station.

The program rated poorly and was not renewed after its first season. Competition from other new drama series and several timeslot changes also contributed to the show's demise.

Cast
Alex Dimitriades as Det Snr Constable Eddie Mercia
Alexandra Davies as Det Snr Constable Donna Parry
Tom Long as Det Snr Constable Guy 'Guido' Martin
Anna Lise Phillips as Det Snr Constable Cameron Smart
Penny Cook as Chief Inspector Sharon Kostas
Katherine Slattery as Madeleine Delaney
Alan Cinis as Phil Emerson
Hanna Griffiths as school girl

See also 
List of Australian television series
List of Nine Network programs

External links

Young Lions at the National Film and Sound Archive

2002 Australian television series debuts
2002 Australian television series endings
2000s Australian drama television series
2000s Australian crime television series
English-language television shows
Nine Network original programming
Television shows set in Sydney
Television series by Endemol Australia